Virendra Razdan (1951 – 13 June 2003) was an Indian actor. He is best known to international audiences for his portrayal of Maulana Azad, a leading figure of the Indian independence movement, in the 1982 biographical film Gandhi directed by Richard Attenborough.

Early Life
Virendra Razdan was born on 6 March 1951 to a middle class Brahmin family at Srinagar, Kashmir. His father Govind Razdan was a Sufi Musician. He aspired to become an actor and worked with few theatre groups in his teen age. He also served as Radio Jockey at Radio Kashmir during early 70’s. It was during 1972 at a mere age of 21 Years, he applied and was selected for a 3 Year Degree course into Acting and Theatre under the guidance of Dr. Ibrahim Alkazi at National School of Drama (NSD) & one year Diploma (Post Grad) course from FTII, Pune.

Acting Career
After graduating he was offered a role as a lecturer at NSD. It was during 1979-80 that Sir Richard Attenborough visited India in search of talented indian actors for his upcoming movie Gandhi. Attenborough visited NSD as it was the biggest premier Institute for acting and discovered Mr. Razdan along with a pool of talented theatre artists for his film.

Mr. Razdan was chosen for a role of Maulana Azad and that’s how his journey as an actor began. Gandhi was a big success and won 8 Academy Awards from 11 Nominations. His next project was B.R Chopra’s Mahabharat where he played Vidur which again was the biggest success story in indian Television History.

Death
Razdan died in Mumbai on 13 June 2003, due to stomach cancer at the age of 52 .

Filmography

Films

Television

References

External links

1951 births
2003 deaths
20th-century Indian male actors
21st-century Indian male actors
Indian male film actors
Indian male television actors
National School of Drama alumni
Year of birth uncertain